Horsfieldia amplomontana is a species tree in the family Myristicaceae. It is endemic to Mount Kinabalu (in Sabah, Malaysia) where its habitat is old-growth and second-growth forests.

References

amplomontana
Endemic flora of Borneo
Trees of Borneo
Flora of Sabah
Vulnerable plants
Taxonomy articles created by Polbot